Walter Benjamin Herreid (January 19, 1896 – November 11, 1941) was an American football player and coach. He served as the head football coach at San Diego State University from 1930 to 1934, compiling a record of 20–21–5. Herreid played college football at Washington State University. He also coached at Beverly Hills High School at Santa Maria High School. Herreid died on November 11, 1941, in Los Angeles, California.

Head coaching record

College

References

1896 births
1941 deaths
American football tackles
San Diego State Aztecs football coaches
Washington State Cougars football players
High school football coaches in California
People from Flandreau, South Dakota